Private Jet Expeditions was a United States charter airline which also operated scheduled passenger service that was part of the OASIS Group from Spain.

History
Private Jet Expeditions was founded in 1989 by Wichita, Kansas entrepreneur Jack P. DeBoer and began operations with a former  Trans World Airlines (TWA) Boeing 727 aircraft to tourist destinations around the world operating under FAR Part 121. After Deboer sold the company its headquarters was moved to Atlanta, GA and was later owned by Apple Vacations and then by the Spanish consortium OASIS.  When Oasis took over, the McDonnell Douglas MD-83 was put into service and service was expanded, including scheduled passenger flights.  In 1993 it had a scheduled route from Chicago to Atlanta and on to Miami.  According to the September 15, 1994 edition of the Official Airline Guide (OAG), the air carrier was operating McDonnell Douglas DC-9-50 and MD-80 jetliners as National Airlines  with the same "5J" airline code used by Private Jet Expeditions. According to the OAG, routes at this time included Miami - Atlanta - Dallas/Fort Worth - Las Vegas; New York LaGuardia Airport - Atlanta - Dallas/Fort Worth; Miami - 
Atlanta - New York LaGuardia Airport; and Chicago Midway Airport - Atlanta - St. Thomas - St.Croix. At one point, an MD-80 was leased from French carrier Air Liberte and used by Private Jet to briefly operate a scheduled Chicago Midway Airport - San Francisco route while retaining the full livery of the French carrier. Because of poor load factors these scheduled routes were abandoned in 
1994 and shortly thereafter Chapter 11 bankruptcy protection was sought.  The charter operations also did not go well and by March 1995 operations were permanently suspended.

Destinations in August 1994 

According to its August 12, 1994 timetable and route map, Private Jet Expeditions was operating scheduled passenger flights as National Airlines with service to the following destinations:

 Atlanta, GA - Hartsfield–Jackson Atlanta International Airport - Hub
 Chicago, IL - Chicago Midway International Airport
 Cincinnati, OH - Cincinnati/Northern Kentucky International Airport
 Dallas, TX/Fort Worth, TX - Dallas/Fort Worth International Airport
 Las Vegas, NV - McCarran International Airport
 Miami, FL - Miami International Airport
 New York City, NY - LaGuardia Airport
 St. Croix - Henry E. Rohlsen Airport
 St. Louis, MO - Lambert–St. Louis International Airport
 St. Thomas - Cyril E. King Airport
 Washington, D.C./Dulles, VA - Washington Dulles International Airport

Fleet

See also 
 List of defunct airlines of the United States

References

External links

Private Jet MD-83 image, Airliners.net

Defunct airlines of the United States
Airlines established in 1989
Airlines disestablished in 1995